Harry Wassell (21 September 1879 – March 1951) was an English professional footballer born in Stourbridge, Worcestershire, who played as a full back. He made 56 appearances in the Football League playing for Small Heath, contributing to their promotion as Second Division runners-up in the 1902–03 season. He also played for Bristol Rovers and Queens Park Rangers in the Southern League.

References
 
 
 

1879 births
1951 deaths
Sportspeople from Stourbridge
English footballers
Association football fullbacks
Brierley Hill Alliance F.C. players
Birmingham City F.C. players
Bristol Rovers F.C. players
Queens Park Rangers F.C. players
English Football League players
Southern Football League players
Date of death missing